The Hat Creek Radio Observatory (HCRO) is operated by SRI International in the Western United States. The observatory is home to the Allen Telescope Array designed and owned by the SETI Institute in Mountain View, CA.

Location 
Latitude: 40° 49' 03" N; longitude: 121° 28' 24" W.

The nearest large city to Hat Creek is Redding, California on highway I-5.

History 
HCRO was founded in the late 1950s by the newly created Radio Astronomy Laboratory (an Organized Research Unit of the Astronomy Department at the University of California, Berkeley).  An 85-foot antenna was installed in 1962 and operated until 1993, when it collapsed during a wind storm. Using it, astronomers discovered the first astrophysical maser. The university managed the facility until 2012, when SRI International assumed site management.

The earliest experiments in millimeter-wave astronomy were performed at this site starting in the 1970s when a 2-element interferometer was constructed. From 1980-1985 a 3-element interferometer was constructed, with another four antennas added between 1990-1992.

After the 85-foot dish was lost, another three antennas were added to the millimeter array for a total of 10 elements. This came to be known as BIMA.

The BIMA telescopes were moved in the spring of 2005 to be combined with other millimeter antennas as part of the Combined Array for Research in Millimeter-wave Astronomy (CARMA) project and to make way for the Allen Telescope Array (ATA).

References

External links
SRI International website
SETI Institute website
Hat Creek Radio Observatory Webpage (Includes tour and contact info.)
Construction site satellite image from Google Maps

Astronomical observatories in California
Buildings and structures in Shasta County, California
Tourist attractions in Shasta County, California
University of California, Berkeley
SRI International